Goodwin Warner Harding (December 11, 1920 - May 11, 1951) was an American ice hockey goaltender who competed in ice hockey at the 1948 Winter Olympics.  He graduated from Harvard University.

Harding was a member of the American ice hockey team which played eight games, but was disqualified, at the 1948 Winter Olympics. Harding played in six games as the goaltender.

External links

1920 births
1951 deaths
American men's ice hockey goaltenders
Harvard Crimson men's ice hockey players
Ice hockey players from Massachusetts
Ice hockey players at the 1948 Winter Olympics
Olympic ice hockey players of the United States
Sportspeople from Brookline, Massachusetts
Sportspeople from Dedham, Massachusetts